New York State Fair station serves the New York State Fairground in Syracuse, New York. It is served by Amtrak Empire Service and Maple Leaf trains while the fair is in operation. The station is located in the southwest corner of the fairgrounds, with a shuttle service to the central area. It consists of an unsheltered low island platform between two of the four tracks of the former New York Central Railroad Water Level Route four-track mainline, with a sheltered waiting area nearby. A mobile lift provides handicapped access.

History

New York Central trains stopped at the fair beginning in the 19th century, but service was eventually discontinued. In 2001, the Empire State Passengers Association brokered talks between Amtrak and the New York State Fair Director about adding the Fair as an Amtrak stop, with positive response from both parties. After an agreement was reached with CSX, the Fair constructed a platform and cinderblock shelter, and Amtrak stopped at the 2002 fair. Approximately 1000 riders — most from Rochester — used the stop in 2002, taking advantage of half-price admission to the fair when arriving by train.

Ridership has remained constant at around 1,000 passengers using the stop at each fair. Most are from Rochester and Buffalo, as Amtrak schedules do not allow riders from the east to spend a full day at the fair, and CENTRO runs buses from Syracuse with higher frequency and lower fares. In 2014, Governor Andrew Cuomo intervened when scheduling conflicts with CSX threatened service to the fair.

References

External links

Amtrak - New York State Fair
New York State Fair Amtrak station (USA RailGuide - TrainWeb)
Station on Google Maps Street View

Amtrak stations in New York (state)
Buildings and structures in Onondaga County, New York
Transportation in Onondaga County, New York
Railway stations in the United States opened in 2002
2002 establishments in New York (state)